Nea Manolada (Greek: Νέα Μανολάδα) is a community in the municipal unit of Vouprasia, Elis, southwestern Greece. It is located in a vast, rural plain, It is 3 km southwest of Neo Vouprasio, 3 km northeast of Varda and 37 km southwest of Patras. The Greek National Road 9 (Patras - Pyrgos) passes east of the village, and the railway Patras - Pyrgos runs through the village. In 2001, a train derailment occurred in Nea Manolada injuring two passengers as a train was heading from Athens to Kyparissia.

See also
List of settlements in Elis

References

External links

Populated places in Elis